"Good to Be Alive (Hallelujah)" is a song by American singer Andy Grammer from the deluxe version of his sophomore album, Magazines or Novels. The song was released on August 24, 2015, during his run on Dancing with the Stars. The song was used in a series of Walmart savings commercials as well as Quaker Oats Chewy Bars.

Composition
According to the sheet music published at Musicnotes.com, the song is written in the key of F major.

Music video 
The music video for "Good to Be Alive," was released to YouTube on November 19, 2015. It depicts Grammer as a parking valet who drives an orange sports car brought by a client and dances with other valets.

Charts

Weekly charts

Year-end charts

Certifications

References

2015 singles
2015 songs
Andy Grammer songs
Songs written by Ross Golan
Songs written by Ian Kirkpatrick (record producer)
Songs written by Andy Grammer